Kızılcahamam–Çerkeş Tunnel is a highway tunnel between Kızılcahamam in Ankara Province and Çerkeş in Çankırı Province in Central Anatolia Region of Turkey.

It was opened to traffic on 27 February 2021. It will allow a much safer and comfortable journey, which is more difficult in harsh winter conditions in the high-elevated and sloping terrain.

References

Road tunnels in Turkey
Transport in Ankara Province
Transport in Çankırı Province